Albert William Christian Theodore Herre (September 16, 1868 – January 16, 1962) was an American ichthyologist and lichenologist. Herre was born in 1868 in Toledo, Ohio. He was an alumnus of Stanford University, where he received a Bachelor of Science degree in botany in 1903. Herre also received a master's degree and a Ph.D. from Stanford, both in ichthyology. He died in Santa Cruz, California in 1962.

Work in the Philippines
Albert W. Herre was perhaps best known for his taxonomic work in the Philippines, where he was the Chief of Fisheries of the Bureau of Science in Manila from 1919 to 1928.  While in the Bureau of Science of the Insular Government of the Philippine Islands (which were administered by the United States at the time), Herre was responsible for discovering and describing many new species of fish.

Legacy
Herre is commemorated in the scientific name of a species of gecko, Lepidodactylus herrei, which is endemic to the Philippines. The fish Mesonoemacheilus herrei Nalbant & Bănărescu, 1982 is named after him.

Selected works

See also
Taxa named by Albert William Herre

References

1868 births
1962 deaths
People from Toledo, Ohio
Stanford University alumni
American zoologists
American expatriates in the Philippines
American ichthyologists
American lichenologists